A hair plexus or root hair plexus is a special group of nerve fiber endings and serves as a very sensitive mechanoreceptor for touch sensation. Each hair plexus forms a network around a hair follicle and is a receptor, which means it sends and receives nerve impulses to and from the brain when the hair moves.

Endings of sensory nerve fibers which form a plexus around a hair follicle in hairy skin. They are mechanoreceptors conveying touch sensation. Specifically, crude touch and pressure sensation conveyed through the spinocervical tract, which is located in the posterior part of the lateral funiculus and terminates in the lateral cervical nucleus. The plexus acts as a receptor.

References

Neurophysiology